Iñigo Cervantes Huegun and Juan Lizariturry became the inaugural doubles champions, beating Lee Hsin-han and Vahid Mirzadeh 7–5, 3–6, [10–8]

Seeds

  Riccardo Ghedin /  Claudio Grassi (semifinals)
  Wesley Koolhof /  Alessandro Motti (semifinals)
  Lee Hsin-han /  Vahid Mirzadeh (final)
  Alessandro Giannessi /  Potito Starace (quarterfinals)

Draw

Draw

References
 Main Draw

International Tennis Tournament of Cortina - Doubles
2014 Doubles